Sir Stanley Fisher (12 February 1867 – 28 May 1949) was a British colonial judge who was the 24th Chief Justice of Ceylon.

Fisher was born in Marylebone into the Knapp-Fisher family, a London legal dynasty. He was the son of George Henry Knapp-Fisher and Elizabeth Goodchild. His brother was Sir Edward Knapp-Fisher.

He served as Chief Justice of Cyprus from 1920 to 1924 and Chief Justice of Trinidad and Tobago from 1924 to 1926.

He was appointed Chief Justice of Ceylon on 11 December 1926 succeeding Charles Ernest St. John Branch and was Chief Justice until 1930. He was succeeded by Philip James Macdonell.

He was knighted in the 1922 New Year Honours.

References

|-

|-

1867 births
1949 deaths
Chief Justices of British Ceylon
Chief justices of Trinidad and Tobago
20th-century Sri Lankan people
19th-century Sri Lankan people
19th-century British people
British Trinidad and Tobago judges
Knights Bachelor
People from British Ceylon
Sri Lankan people of English descent